Terry De Koning (born 10 May 1961) is  a former Australian rules footballer who played with Footscray in the Victorian Football League (VFL). His sons Tom and Sam play for Carlton and Geelong respectively in the Australian Football League.

Notes

External links 		
		

		
Living people
1961 births
Australian people of Dutch descent
Australian rules footballers from Victoria (Australia)
Western Bulldogs players